The 1940 United States Senate elections coincided with the election of Franklin D. Roosevelt to his third term as president. The 32 seats of Class 1 were contested in regular elections, and special elections were held to fill vacancies.

Although Roosevelt was re-elected, support for his administration had dropped somewhat after eight years, and the Republican opposition gained three seats from the Democrats.  However, the New Deal Democrats regained firm control of both the House and Senate because Progressives dominated the election.  The Minnesota Farmer–Labor Party also disappeared from the Senate, as Henrik Shipstead joined the Republican party and Ernest Lundeen had died during the preceding term. Senator Harry S. Truman of Missouri was elected to his final term in the Senate in 1940. Truman resigned in 1945 to serve as President Roosevelt's third Vice President.

Gains, losses, and holds

Retirements
Two Republicans and two Democrats retired instead of seeking re-election.

Defeats
Six Democrats and two Republicans sought re-election but lost in the primary or general election.

Post-election changes
One Democrat was re-elected but died on November 10th, 1940. A Democrat was appointed in his place.

Party switches
One Farmer-Labor senator was re-elected as a Republican.

Change in composition

Before the elections

Election results

Race summaries

Special elections during the 76th Congress
In these special elections, the winner elected during 1940 and seated once qualified; ordered by election date.

Races leading to the 77th Congress
In these regular elections, the winners were elected for the term beginning January 3, 1941; ordered by state.

All of the elections involved the Class 1 seats.

Closest races 
Thirteen races had a margin of victory under 10%:

There is no tipping point state.

Arizona

California

Connecticut

Delaware

Florida

Idaho (special)

Illinois (special)

Indiana

Kentucky (special)

Maine

Maryland

Massachusetts

Michigan

Minnesota

Mississippi

Missouri 

One-term Democrat Harry S. Truman was narrowly re-elected.  He would only serve until resigning January 17, 1945, to become U.S. Vice President.

Montana

Nebraska

Nevada

New Jersey

New Mexico

New York 

The whole ticket nominated by Democrats and American Laborites was elected.

North Dakota

Ohio

Pennsylvania

Rhode Island

Tennessee

Texas

Utah

Vermont 

There were 2 elections due to the June 20, 1940, death of two-term Republican Ernest Willard Gibson.

Vermont (regular) 

Two-term Republican Warren Austin was easily re-elected.  He faced no opponents in the primary.

Austin served only until his August 2, 1946, resignation to become U.S. Ambassador to the United Nations.

Vermont (special) 

Gibson's son, Republican Ernest W. Gibson Jr. was appointed June 24, 1940, to continue his father's term, pending a special election, in which he was not a candidate.

Aiken did not take the seat until January 10, 1941, as he wanted to remain Governor of Vermont. He would be repeatedly re-elected and serve until his 1975 retirement.

Virginia

Washington

West Virginia

Wisconsin

Wyoming

See also
 1940 United States elections
 1940 United States presidential election
 1940 United States gubernatorial elections
 1940 United States House of Representatives elections
 76th United States Congress
 77th United States Congress

Notes

References